Thendral is a 2009 Indian Tamil-language soap opera that aired Monday through Friday on Sun TV. It was broadcast from 7 December 2009 to 17 January 2015 for 1340 episodes.

The show stars Shruthi Raj and Deepak Dinkar and revolves around a girl's struggle in a middle-class family, focusing on the importance of women's education. It was produced by Vikatan Televistas Pvt Ltd and directed by S. Kumaran. The show replaced Kolangal which was also produced by Vikatan Televistas. Thendral was amongst the first Tamil Serials to go viral on the internet. The Indian newspaper Business Standard describes it as the "first youthful prime time daily soap in Tamil". Thendral has been highly acclaimed and has won many awards. After a nine-year hiatus, the show returned from 10 December 2018 on Vikatan Prime Time YouTube channel every day at 9:30 PM. It is currently re-telecasting in Colors Tamil from May 16, 2022 at 02:00PM

Plot
This serial revolves around the main character Thulasi (Shruthi Raj). Thulasi's mother left her when she was a child for the sake of money and, ever since, her family has shunned her, especially her father and stepmother. The only family member that genuinely cares for her is her grandmother (S. N. Lakshmi). Thulasi's only dream is to continue her studies to become an engineer and help her family, and she gets the highest marks on her 12th board exams. Thulasi's father Muthumanikam a.k.a. Manikam (Subhalekha Sudhakar) dreams about seeing his son, Mohan (Ayyappan) becoming an engineer, yet his dreams are put on hold due to the lack of money. Knowing this, a break-inspector and a thug in the 40s, Velayudham (Nizhalgal Ravi) approaches them to help Manikam's dream come true, under one condition: that is if he agrees to get Thulasi married to him. A greedy Manickam coaxes Thulasi that the only way she can wipe away the sin committed by her mother, who had fled away with another man, is by marrying Velayudham. Stung by guilt, Thulasi agrees to marry Velayudham despite their age difference. Velayudham, in return, offers Manickam a massive amount of cash. But fate has other plans, and so by mistake, the photos of Thulasi and that of another girl Lavanya (Neelima Rani) mix up in a photo studio and ends up in the hands of the hero – Tamizharasu (Deepak Dinkar). Lavanya happens to be the sister of Tamizharasu. On seeing Thulasi's photo, she conveys that she would like to have a sister-in-law as beautiful as Thulasi. Attracted by Thulasi's beauty and the frequent taunts by Lavanya, Tamizharasu falls in love with Thulasi. Thulasi refuses to accept Tamizharasu's love and publicly insults him at his bank.

Meanwhile, Tamizharasu's mother wants him to marry a rich girl of her choice so that she can be the controller of her second daughter-in-law. Her relationship with the eldest-daughter-in-law Sudha is not in good terms, and so she wants Tamizharasu to marry a rich girl who is ready to be within the line drawn by her. She selects Charulatha (Srividya), the adopted daughter of a wealthy businessman, as the prospective bride. Tamizharasu is deeply saddened by Thulasi's refusal and so he accepts the engagement between Charu and him. However, through a string of events, Thulasi falls for Tamizh when he stops her marriage with Velayudham and joins her in an engineering college, paying the fees for her. Nevertheless, the marriage between Charu and Tamizh is arranged; Charu surrenders herself to Tamizh and sees him as her husband already, but Tamizh only loves Thulasi.
 
A sudden turn of events sees Tamizh marrying Thulasi at a temple without the consent of his family. The turn of events shatters Charu, and slowly she turns into a psychopath after directly witnessing the marriage between Tamizh and Thulasi. She develops a deadly vengeance towards Thulasi as she assumes that it was Thulasi who grabbed Tamizharasu from her. Charu and Tamizharasu's mother conspire to separate Tamizharasu and Thulasi. Thulasi catches the plot and explains Charu's mentality to Tamizharasu, but Charu cleverly outwits Thulasi. Tamizh thinks that Thulasi has no trust in him and their relationship turns sour. Tamizh is ready to divorce her, but Thulasi begs Tamizh for a last chance to prove Charu's dirty thoughts and succeeds in exposing her actual colour. Tamizharasu starts hating Charu. In disappointment and vengeance, Charu tries to commit suicide and she falls into coma. Her track in the story is concluded by showing her as a person who had lost all her memory and is incapable of attending even to her own needs.

Thulasi's mother, Bhuvana (Aishwarya/Sudha Chandran)  lives with her second husband, Lakshmanan, a doctor by profession and their son Prabhakar. Bhuvana had helped Lakshmanan become successful man and they own a hospital in which she is the chairman. Bhuvana is also a greedy and evil woman who only thinks money to be superior. Thulasi and Bhuvana's first meeting does not go well although they did not know the relationship between them. Soon after, Lakshmanan's first wife, Sundari (Yuvarani) who also happens to be Tamizh's former boss learns that Thulasi is Bhuvana's daughter. In a fierce fight between Thulasi and Bhuvana, the latter slaps her. Bhuvana plans to take revenge on Thulasi and breaks Thulasi's hand using her henchmen. Later, Thulasi and Bhuvana learn the real bond between them through Manikam, but Bhuvana despises Thulasi and says that she considers her not a daughter but a humiliation. Heartbroken, Thulasi decides to take revenge on Bhuvana by separating her from Lakshmanan and his wealth. At last, Bhuvana pretends to be having cancer so that her husband, son, Thulasi, and the others will pity her. She even goes to the extent of pretending to be a lovable mother to Thulasi. She separates Thulasi and her father, which results in Manikkam's suicide attempt after he misunderstands that Thulasi had betrayed him and had joined her mother.

Nevertheless, Thulasi, Thamizharasu and Sundari all find out that Bhuvana is lying. They resolve and successfully exposes the truth to Prabha and Lakshmanan. They chase Bhuvana away from their house, but Bhuvana plays a revenge game on Lakshmanan by setting up a fire in his hospital, and she cunningly makes him jailed for her crime. Lakshmanan and Sundari's 60th Marriage Ceremony is halted due to Lakshmanan's imprisonment. Lakshmanan asks Varadhan, his driver, to get his daughter Deepa (Thulasi's best friend) married to Prabhakar so that his honour will be saved. Deepa sacrifices her dreams and marries Prabhakar.

Kalyani (an auto driver and Thulasi's other close friend) and Mohan's love story too comes up. Mohan wants to marry Kalyani but Padma hates her due to being poor and financially unstable than them. Nevertheless, Kalyani marries Mohan despite Padma's wishes. Deepa divorces Prabhakar as he suspects her of being in love with Kanagu (he is Tamizh's friend and had a crush on Deepa). Finally, he repents his mistake and turns into a new leaf. Padma too realises her mistakes and apologizes wholeheartedly to Thulasi.

Charu, then, returns from coma. Tamizh's mother again tries to separate Tamizh and Thulasi. Tamizh strongly opposes and says that he would never leave Thulasi again. Thulasi goes into prison for a crime she didn't commit because of Maya, Charu's real mother. Maya decides to separate Tamizh and Thulasi by drugging Tamizh and making him forget Thulasi. Thulasi, however, saves Tamizh at the correct time, and Charu and her mother die thereafter. Tamizh's mother still doesn't likes Thulasi but is forced to accept her as her daughter in law as she has no other choice.

The rest of the story involves around how Thulasi, alongside her now understanding husband Tamizharasu, overcome all the other trials and tribulations. The serial ends on a happy note with Thulasi becoming pregnant.

Cast

Main cast

 Shruthi Raj as Thulasi Thamizharasan (Kuttymma), Thamizharasan's wife, Muthumanikkam and Bhuvana's daughter; Padma's stepdaughter; Mohan, Prabhakar and Pavithra's stepsister; Deepa and Kalyani's best friend.
 Deepak Dinkar as Thamizharasan aka Thamizharasu/Thamizh (Kuttyppa), Thulasi's husband; Rukkumani's son; Lavanya and Puvi's brother.
 Hemalatha as Deepa Prabhakar; Thulasi and Kalyani's bestfriend; Prabhakar's wife; Varatharajan and Indira's daughter
 Suzane George (1-878) / S. R. Kaviya Varshini Arun (879- 1340) as Kalyani Mohan; Mohan's wife, Thulasi and Deepa's best friend.
 Srividya (75-554)/(1125-1241)as Charulatha Veera Raghavan, Tamizh's ex-fiancé and Nithish's cousin sister. (Protagonist turned Antagonist) Died. Accidentally killed by Maya
 Adams as Prabhakar; Laxmanan and Bhuvana's son. Thulasi's stepbrother. Deepa's husband.
 Ayyappan as Mohan Muthumanikkam; Kalyani's husband; Thulasi's stepbrother; Pavithra's brother

Recurring cast

Other cast

Production

Casting
Shruthi Raj was approached for the female lead, initially she refused, but Shruthi Raj reconsidered her decision after realizing that this series will be produced by a well reputed company like Vikatan Televistas as a replacement for the time slot of their highly successful series Kolangal.  Moreover, she was also interested with the story narrated by S. Kumaran. Shruthi Raj made her acting debut in television with this series. Television actor and anchor Deepak Dinkar, who is very well known for playing supporting roles and negative roles in many serials, was signed to play the male lead Thamizharasan, marking his 2nd collaboration with both the director and company after the successfully running series Thirumathi Selvam in which he was already playing a supporting role with grey shades.

Filming
The series was filmed in Chennai, Kodaikanal, Valparai, Thiruverkadu, Nerkundram, Mamallapuram, Chengalpattu, and Bangalore in India.

Reception
The Indian newspaper Business Standard describes it as the "first youthful prime time daily soap in Tamil". Thendral has been highly acclaimed and has won many awards. Thendral was amongst the first Tamil Serials to go viral on the internet.
The comedy track between Tamizh's mother and Nithish were well received by audience. Still the serial loved by audience. The ending was little bit rush. But still it has a happy ending unlike other vikatan serials.

Soundtrack

All songs were composed by music director Kiran. Lyrics were written by Yugabharathi.

Awards

Remakes
The series has been remade in Telugu language as Sravani Subramanyam broadcast on Gemini TV, Malayalam language as Illam Thennal Pole broadcast on Surya TV and Kannada language as Thangaali broadcast on Udaya TV.

Crossover
Thendral had a crossover with Thirumathi Selvam as a special episode on 1 May 2011.

See also
 List of programs broadcast by Sun TV (India)

References

External links
 

Sun TV original programming
2000s Tamil-language television series
Tamil-language romance television series
2009 Tamil-language television series debuts
Tamil-language television shows
2015 Tamil-language television series endings